Fisher distribution may refer to any of several probability distributions named after Ronald Fisher:

Behrens–Fisher distribution
Fisher's noncentral hypergeometric distribution
Fisher's z-distribution
Fisher's fiducial distribution
Fisher–Bingham distribution
F-distribution, also called Fisher–Snedecor distribution or Fisher F-distribution
Fisher–Tippett distribution
Von Mises–Fisher distribution on a sphere